Toorourrong Reservoir is a small water supply reservoir located on the southern slopes of the Great Dividing Range approximately  north of Melbourne, Victoria, Australia. The reservoir is formed by the Toorourrong Dam across the Plenty River, and an interbasin transfer. The dam is operated by Melbourne Water and the reservoir forms part of the Melbourne water supply system. Water from the Toorourrong Reservoir flows by aqueduct to the Yan Yean Reservoir.

Description
The reservoir is formed by an earthen embankment dam across the eastern branch of the Plenty River below the junction with Jacks Creek. The system was constructed in 1883–1885 as an extension of the Yan Yean water system. Water is diverted from Wallaby and Silver Creeks, part of the Murray–Darling basin on the northern side of the Great Dividing Range—via the open, granite-lined Wallaby Aqueduct—across the Great Dividing Range just east of Mount Disappointment, then into Jacks Creek and into the reservoir. The reservoir acts as a settling basin before the water travels  down the Clearwater Channel to Yan Yean. The reservoir catchments are within the Wallaby Creek section of the Kinglake National Park.

A safety review in 2006 recommended remedial works be undertaken on the dam.  Grouted stone columns were installed on both the upstream and downstream sides of the dam wall in 2011.

History
The Yan Yean Reservoir, completed in 1857, was Melbourne's first water supply system. In 1879 low dam levels showed that further water sources were necessary to meet increased demand by a growing population. The Wallaby Creek aqueduct was constructed in 1882–1883 to divert water via an interbasin transfer from Wallaby Creek via Jacks Creek and the Plenty River to Yan Yean. The reservoir was constructed in 1883–1885 and linked to Yan Yean by the Clearwater Channel aqueduct, and the Wallaby Creek aqueduct was extended north to harvest Silver Creek. Public Works Department engineer William Thwaites designed most of these works. As water quality in the lower Plenty River had deteriorated, the intake from the river at Yan Yean Reservoir was closed and all water supply was drawn from the closed forest catchments via Toorourrong.

The reservoir and associated works are listed on the Victorian Heritage Register.

Toorourrong Reservoir Park
Below the dam wall is the  Toorourrong Reservoir Park. The park and surrounding forest were burned in the 2009 Victorian bushfires. The park is now open to the public.

In 2011, the City of Whittlesea's Bushfires Memorial Working Group selected Toorourrong Reservoir as a site for a memorial to remember the impact of the Victorian bushfires on the local community.

There is a platypus-watching hide overlooking the reservoir. The Australian Platypus Conservatory was based at the reservoir from 1996 to 2007 and at that time the area supported approximately 30 platypus. The effect of the 2009 fires on the platypus is not currently known.

References

External links

Victorian Heritage Register
Reservoirs in Victoria (Australia)
Dams in Victoria (Australia)
Dams completed in 1885
Interbasin transfer
Embankment dams
1885 establishments in Australia